Ahlab (- fatness), a town of Asher lying within the unconquered Phoenician border (Judg. 1:31), north-west of the Sea of Galilee; commonly identified with Gischala (probably hellenized , "gush halav"), now Jish.

Hebrew Bible cities